FC Lustenau 07 is a football club based in Lustenau, Vorarlberg. They currently compete in the Vorarlbergliga, one of the fourth tiers of Austrian football. Until the 2012–13 they played in the Second League.

Although the club has never had much domestic success, it played a pivotal role in the development of European club football prior to UEFA-sanctioned competitions.

Honours 

Bodensee-Fußballvereinigung
Winner (7): 1910, 1911, 1913, 1926, 1927, 1932, 1933

External links 
Worldfootball.net page
Vorarlberger Fußball-Verband.at page

Football clubs in Austria
Association football clubs established in 1907
1907 establishments in Austria